KJOE (106.1 FM) is a radio station in Slayton, Minnesota, United States, broadcasting a country music format. The station serves the Pipestone and Worthington areas, with rimshot coverage in the Marshall area. The station is currently owned by Collin Christensen and Carmen Christensen, through licensee Christensen Broadcasting, LLC.

References

External links
KJOE official website

Radio stations in Minnesota
Country radio stations in the United States
Radio stations established in 1995
1995 establishments in Minnesota